"Peer Pressure" is a song by English singer-songwriter James Bay, featuring vocals of American singer Julia Michaels. The song was released by Republic Records on 22 February 2019, through digital download and streaming formats. "Peer Pressure" was written by the two artists, and produced by New Zealand musician Joel Little.

Music video
A music video to accompany the release of "Peer Pressure" was first premiered onto YouTube on 29 March 2019 at a total length of three minutes.

Live performances
On 16 April 2019, Bay and Michaels performed the song for the first time on The Ellen DeGeneres Show.

Charts

Weekly charts

Year-end charts

Certifications

References

2019 songs
2019 singles
James Bay (singer) songs
Julia Michaels songs
Republic Records singles
Songs written by James Bay (singer)
Songs written by Julia Michaels
Song recordings produced by Joel Little